Seymour Lodge is a Victorian Gothic mansion located in Perth Road, Dundee, Scotland. It is a category A listed building.

History 

It was built as a private villa in 1880 by architects Charles and Leslie Ower, for Henry McGrady. The building was later utilised as Seymour Lodge School which was a private all-girls establishment. In 1939, when Britain declared war on Germany, the school relocated to Ochtertyre House, Crieff, and closed in 1966. The house was afterwards used as a child protection unit, which was replaced by new accommodation at King's Cross Hospital. Seymour Lodge was offered for sale in November 2012.

References

Category A listed buildings in Dundee
Listed houses in Scotland
Houses completed in 1880